The 3rd municipal election in Norfolk County, Ontario, Canada took place on November 13, 2006. Dennis Travale, a businessman who also ran in the 2000 election, was elected mayor. Rita Kalmbach had chosen not to run for re-election due to personal reasons. It was the first election in Norfolk County history to have electronic voting in place.

Mayoral race

County council

Ward 1

Ward 2

Ward 3

Ward 4

Ward 5
Two to be elected

Ward 6

Ward 7

Sources
Norfolk County Municipal Election 2006

See also
 2010 Norfolk County municipal elections
 2003 Norfolk County municipal elections
 2000 Norfolk County municipal elections

Municipal elections in Norfolk County, Ontario
2006 Ontario municipal elections